The Perizzites ( Pərīzzī) are a group of people mentioned many times in the Bible as having lived in the land of Canaan before the arrival of the Israelites. The name may be related to a Hebrew term meaning "rural person."

History

Biblical mentions of Perizzites extend from the time of Abraham (Genesis 13:7) to the time of Ezra and Nehemiah (Ezra 9:1–2). According to Michael LeFebvre, Ezra's reference to the Perizzites does not imply that a group still known as Perizzites existed in the land in Ezra's time. It is instead to be understood as a literary reference by Ezra to passages such as Exodus 34:11–16, Exodus 33:2 and Deuteronomy 7:1–5, which prohibited intermarriage with a variety of non-Israelite peoples, including Perizzites, among others.

The time during which Perizzites were most in conflict with the Israelites seems to be the time of Joshua into the early period of the Judges.

According to the Book of Joshua, the Perizzites were in the hill country of Judah and Ephraim (Joshua 11:3, 17:14–15). According to 1 Kings 9:21, they were enslaved by Solomon.

According to Hittitologist Trevor R. Bryce, "The Perizzites cannot be linked to any peoples or lands known from extra-biblical sources" but there are speculative links to the Hivites and the Jebusites, who may have originated from a region called Que in Assyrian sources or Kue/Quoah in biblical sources.

Jewish Encyclopedia entry

Canaanitish tribe settled in the south of Canaan between Hor and Negeb, although it is not mentioned in the genealogy in Gen. x. According to the Biblical references, Abraham, when he entered Canaan, found the Perizzites dwelling near the Canaanites (ib. xiii. 7), and God promised to destroy both these peoples (ib. xv. 20). Jacob reproved his sons because of the crime of Shechem, inasmuch as he feared the Perizzites and the Canaanites (ib. xxxiv. 30). Moses promised the Israelites to bring them unto the place of the Perizzites and the Amorites (Ex. xxx. 8); and at a later time the tribes of Simeon and Judah conquered the Canaanites and the Perizzites (Judges i. 4). The Perizzites were among the tribes that were not subjected to tribute by Solomon (I Kings ix. 20-22), while the complaint was brought to Ezra that the priests and the Levites would not separate themselves from the Perizzites and the other peoples of the land (Ezra ix. 1).

The view was formerly held that the Perizzites were a prehistoric tribe which became assimilated to the Canaanites when the latter invaded Canaan; but this is in contradiction to the fact that the Perizzites are not mentioned in the genealogy. More recent commentators are of the opinion that the names "Perizi" and "Perazi" are identical, and that the Bible has included under the name "Perizzites" all stocks dwelling in unwalled towns.

Bibliography

 Riehm, Handwörterb. 2nd ed., p. 1211
 Cheyne and Black, Encyclopedia Biblica, s.v.;
 Hastings' Dictionary of the Bible, s.v. 
 The Zondervan Pictorial Encyclopedia of the Bible; Merrill Tenney, ed., Zondervan Publishing House, ©1976; Vol. 4, p. 704

References

External links
"Perizzites". Jewish Encyclopedia.

Ancient peoples
Hebrew Bible nations